The Lama Lama, also spelt Lamalama, are a contemporary Aboriginal Australian people of the eastern Cape York Peninsula in northern Queensland. The term was formerly used as one of the ethnonyms associated with a distinct tribe or clan group, the Bakanambia. They are today an aggregation of remnants of several former tribes or clan groups.

Languages
The Lamalama were constituted from several distinct language groups, speaking respectively Umpithamu, Morrobalama (Umbuygamu), Mba Rumbathama (Lamalama) and Rimanggudinhma.

History
The Lama Lama people arose out of the fusion of roughly 40 patrician clans and something like five distinct language groups and an as yet unknown number of local people, to form a distinct group in their own right, exercising a collective land right based on their diverse heritage of land ownership. They now consist of more than a dozen cognatic descent groups.

Notable people
 Barry Port, Australia's last Aboriginal tracker employed solely for the role, died 2020.

See also
Lama Lama National Park

Notes

Citations

Sources

 (Available online at Sydney University Library as PDF.)

Aboriginal peoples of Queensland